The 2009 Skycity Triple Crown was the fifth race meeting of the 2009 V8 Supercar Championship Series. It contained Races 9 and 10 of the series and was held on the weekend of 19–21 June at Hidden Valley Raceway, in Darwin, in the Northern Territory, Australia.

Recent changes

With just 103 racing laps all weekend of the 2.9 kilometre venue, the race meeting is significantly shorter than recent V8 Supercar rounds at just 300 kilometres of racing against the 400 kilometre norm. It is also shorter than the 2008 Skycity Triple Crown which raced 360 kilometres over its three races last year.

Race 9
The first race was held on Saturday 20 June. Tander started well from third grid position to move past polesitter Jason Richards and settled to chase leader Whincup. Jack Perkins was an early retirement with bent steering. Lowndes was the first of the front running cars to pit on lap 7. Tander lost ground during the pitstops, falling behind teammate Davison, and when Jason Richards vaulted past after his later stop.

With the stops completed, Whincup held a clear lead over a tight group of Jason Richards, Mark Winterbottom, Will Davison and Garth Tander. Late in the race with car condition falling away Jason Richards speared off the track at the end of the front straight, dropping behind the HRT pair then lost position to Todd Kelly and Craig Lowndes and kept James Courtney out of seventh position by just a single hundredth of a second.

Race 10
Race 2 was held on Sunday 21 June.

Results

Qualifying Race 9

Race 9

Standings
 After round 5 of 14

References

External links
Official series website
Official timing and results

Darwin
June 2009 sports events in Australia
Sport in Darwin, Northern Territory
2000s in the Northern Territory
Motorsport in the Northern Territory